Eyebrow Peak is a prominent  glaciated mountain summit located in the Purcell Mountains in southeast British Columbia, Canada. It is the ninth-highest peak in the Purcells. Its nearest higher peak is Commander Mountain,  to the southeast. The first ascent of the mountain was made in 1914 by Edward Warren Harnden, D. Brown, L. Nettleton, and E. Parson via the west slopes. The name Eyebrow Peak came about by Arthur Oliver Wheeler in 1910 when viewing two broad rock scars near the summit, and their arrangement in connection with the surrounding snow created the appearance of enormous eyebrows. However, using the same sightings as Wheeler, Professor Peter Robinson showed that Wheeler actually saw Mount Farnham. Poor weather conditions led to Wheeler's error, and the Eyebrow moniker was then moved to its present location. The mountain's name was officially adopted June 9, 1960, by the Geographical Names Board of Canada.

Climate
Based on the Köppen climate classification, Eyebrow Peak is located in a subarctic climate zone with cold, snowy winters, and mild summers. Temperatures can drop below −20 °C with wind chill factors  below −30 °C. Precipitation runoff from Eyebrow Peak and meltwater from its surrounding glaciers drains into Horsethief Creek, which is a tributary of the Columbia River.

Climbing Routes
Established climbing routes on Eyebrow Peak:

 West Slopes -  First ascent 1914
 Southwest Face - First ascent 1928
 West Face - First ascent 1928
 South Ridge - First ascent 1928

See also

 Geography of British Columbia
 Geology of British Columbia

References

External links
 Weather: Eyebrow Peak
 Eyebrow Peak aerial photo: PBase

Three-thousanders of British Columbia
Purcell Mountains
Kootenay Land District